Cringleford is a civil parish and village in the English county of Norfolk. The village sits on the River Yare and forms part of the outskirts of Norwich.

History
Cringleford's name is of mixed Viking and Anglo-Saxon origin and derives from an amalgamation of the Old English and Old Norse for a circular ford over the River Yare.

In the Domesday Book, Cringleford is listed as a settlement of 25 households located in the hundred of Humbleyard. In 1086, the village was divided between the estates of Odo of Bayeux, Alan of Brittany and Roger Bigod.

Geography
According to the 2011 Census, Cringleford has a population of 2,963 residents living in 1,275 households.

Cringleford falls within the constituency of South Norfolk and is represented at Parliament by Richard Bacon MP of the Conservative Party.

St. Peter's Church
Cringleford's parish church is of Norman origin and is dedicated to Saint Peter. The tower was significantly remodelled in the Fourteenth Century with a further aisle being added in the late Nineteenth Century. The stained glass was installed in the early Twentieth Century by Lavers, Barraud and Westlake with a further depiction of Saint Andrew completed by Herbert Bryans.

Amenities
The majority of local children attend Cringleford Church of England Primary School which was recently extensively refurbished and extended. In 2017, Cringleford Primary was rated by Ofsted as 'Outstanding.'

Sports
Cringleford Lodge Cricket Club was founded in 2000 after the merger of Cringleford C.C. and Earlham Lodge C.C. 

Cringleford Junior Football Club was founded in 2005 and is open to Children between ages 5 and 17.

War Memorial
Cringleford's war memorial takes the form of a carved wooden plaque located inside St. Peter's Church. It lists the following names for the First World War:
 Captain Kenneth N. W. Gibson (1888-1918), 32nd Battery, Royal Field Artillery
 Lieutenant Norman Ayris (1891-1915), 98th (Field) Company, Royal Engineers
 Private John Thrower (d.1916), 11th Battalion, Durham Light Infantry
 Private William Shorten (1880-1916), 25th (Nova Scotia Rifles) Battalion, Canadian Expeditionary Force
 Private Arthur E. Denmark (1882-1914), 1st Battalion, Royal Norfolk Regiment
 Private Ernest Elsey (d.1915), 9th Battalion, Royal Norfolk Regiment
 Boy-Second Class Henry P. Fickling (1901-1918), HMS Powerful
 Harold Bloomfield
 William Broom
 Leslie Bryant
 John Moore
 Charles Smith

And, the following for the Second World War:
 Lieutenant-Commander Stanley L. Garrett (1905-1942), HMS Anking
 Captain Maurice P. Gaymer (1916-1942), 4th Battalion, Royal Norfolk Regiment
 Flight-Lieutenant Cyril D. G. Garland (1904-1942), No. 80 Squadron RAF
 Corporal William A. C. Bond (1919-1944), No. 614 Squadron RAF
 Lance-Corporal Percy H. J. Clark (d.1941), Royal Pioneer Corps

St. Peter's Church is also home to a second wooden plaque with a Roll of Honour listing the men of Cringleford who fought and returned from the First World War.

Notes

References

External links

Villages in Norfolk
Civil parishes in Norfolk